Magnus A. Carlsson (born 21 August 1980) is a Swedish professional golfer.

Carlsson was born in Västerås, Sweden. He turned professional in 2001.

Carlsson played on the Challenge Tour from 2003 to 2007. He secured his first ever professional win in 2007 at the Challenge of Ireland. He went on to finish seventh in the Challenge Tour Order of Merit that same year, ensuring he would play on the European Tour in 2008.

In his debut season on the European Tour, Carlsson was edged out in a playoff at the Joburg Open by Richard Sterne. He returned to the Challenge Tour in 2010, and again in 2012 and successfully regained his European Tour playing rights each time.

Professional wins (3)

Challenge Tour wins (1)

Nordic Golf League wins (2)

Playoff record
European Tour playoff record (0–1)

See also
2007 Challenge Tour graduates
2010 Challenge Tour graduates
2012 Challenge Tour graduates

External links

Profile at golfdata.se

Swedish male golfers
European Tour golfers
Sportspeople from Västerås
Golfers from Stockholm
1980 births
Living people
21st-century Swedish people